The Pribina Sailplane Grand Prix 2008 was the fourth qualifying Gliding Grand Prix for the FAI World Grand Prix 2008. 

Gliding competitions
International sports competitions hosted by Slovakia